The 2002 Independence Bowl was a post-season college football bowl game between the Nebraska Cornhuskers and the Ole Miss Rebels on December 27, 2002, at Independence Stadium in Shreveport, Louisiana. Ole Miss won the game 27–23; Ole Miss quarterback Eli Manning, who passed for 313 yards and a touchdown, was the offensive player of the game. After the loss, Nebraska finished the season 7–7, ending a forty-year streak of winning seasons for the Cornhuskers.

References 

Independence Bowl
Nebraska Cornhuskers football bowl games
Ole Miss Rebels football bowl games
Independence Bowl
Independence bowl
December 2002 sports events in the United States